Georg Heinrich Friedrich Enckhausen (also spelled Enkhausen, Enghausen and Enghusen, born August 28, 1799 in Celle; died January 15, 1885 in Hanover) was a German pianist, organist, horn player, composer and singing teacher.

Life and career 
Heinrich Friedrich Enckhausen began studying music with his father, Heinrich Friedrich Enckhausen, Celle's last town council musician. In 1816 he was accepted into the music band of the cuirassiers in Celle, where he played violin, flute, clarinet, cello and pianoforte. In 1826 he moved to Berlin and studied piano and composition with Aloys Schmitt. Enckhausen went to the court of Hanover with Schmitt when he was appointed court organist there. Enckhausen played there from 1827 to 1832 as a horn player in the court orchestra. After Schmitt's departure from Hanover, Enckhausen directed the singing academy. In 1833 he became a singing teacher at the teachers' college. In 1839 he finally received the position of organist at the Castle Church in Hanover, which he held until his retirement. From 1845 he worked as a singing teacher at the Lyceum in Hanover.

Meanwhile, on June 16, 1836, Enckhausem was a member of the St. Johannis Free Mason's Lodge Zur Ceder.

Enckhausen's daughter Malwine Enckhausen, who later became a writer, was born in Hanover on October 29, 1843.

Enckhausen wrote the opera Der Savoyard in Hanover in 1832. He also wrote religious music. Furthermore, he composed around 70 pieces for military band, piano and solo voices.

Literature 
 Harald Müller: Enckhausen, Heinrich Friedrich. In: MGG Online (subscription necessary).
 Heinrich Friedrich Enckhausen. In: Nicolas Slonimsky: Baker's Biographical Dictionary of Musicians. 7th edition. Oxford University Press, London / New York / Toronto 1984, ISBN 0-19-311335-X, p. 662.

External links 
 Enckhausen, Heinrich Friedrich (1799-1885), (28.08.1799, Celle – 15.01.1885, Hannover), Kalliope-Verbund
 Enckhausen, Heinrich Frd., Deutsche Biographie

References 

19th-century organists
German male organists
1799 births
1885 deaths
German male composers
19th-century German composers
German composer stubs
German military musicians
German horn players
19th-century pianists
German pianists
Voice teachers
19th-century conductors (music)
German conductors (music)
Musicians from Hanover
German Freemasons